General Hunt Stockwell is a fictional character in the 1980s action/adventure television series, The A-Team played by Robert Vaughn. Hunt Stockwell appeared on The A-Team in its final season (season five, 1986–1987). He represented the dramatic shift that the A-Team underwent in the final season, as their new primary antagonist and boss. Similar to how Jack Ging was brought in the fourth season of the show, Robert Vaughn was cast partially in the hope that he could mend fences between George Peppard, whom he had long been a friend of, and Mr. T.

Fictional character biography
The character of Stockwell first appears in the opening episode of the show's fifth season, "The Dishpan Man". In the first three episodes of the season (a story arc commonly referred to as either "The Court Martial" or "The Revolution"), it is through Stockwell's manipulation that the A-Team comes to work for him, offering them a pardon after fulfilling an unspecified number of missions that they perform for him.

Stockwell is never accepted onto the team in any traditional sense, although he is shown to be capable of working with them quite well at times too. Nonetheless, a few episodes have the members of the team either threatening to kill, leave or otherwise rebel against Stockwell: 
 Murdock threatens to kill Stockwell in the "Court Martial" arc if he doesn't help him.
 In the episode "Alive at Five", Face considers leaving the team after having had enough of Stockwell's manipulations.
 Murdock is also later faced with an almost apathetic Stockwell when Murdock asks Stockwell to look into Face's paternity.
 Both Face and Murdock have a confrontation with Stockwell when they believe Hannibal might have died on a solo mission.
 Hannibal himself also has trouble with Stockwell's pressuring and manipulation in a few episodes, most notably "The Crystal Skull" and "Without Reservations".
Even then, Stockwell does show a certain appreciation for the team, but it is balanced by his attitude towards their expendability, often given them certain time-related ultimatums. He shows some emotion when it comes to Hannibal, whom he seems to respect (even likening him to himself), and when he is confronted by Murdock and Face in "Point of No Return". From time to time however, he makes sure to remind the team that the missions are to be done "My way."

Not much is revealed of Stockwell's own history, although several pieces are filled in, in the episode "The Say U.N.C.L.E. Affair" (a reference to Robert Vaughn's starring role on the show The Man from U.N.C.L.E.), wherein he is betrayed and held captive by his former partner Ivan Trigorin (played by David McCallum, also Vaughn's co-star on The Man from U.N.C.L.E.). In the episode "Point of No Return" it is revealed Stockwell spent a great deal of time in Hong Kong, where he built up an extensive intelligence network. He also refers to operating in Cuba where he was captured and tortured alongside Trigorin.

Stockwell is most often assisted by Carla, who also takes over the operation when Stockwell is captured. Stockwell has access to a large number of agents all over the world and numerous intelligence resources. As Stockwell himself explains: "I work inside the system. I keep my skirts clean, I am a dedicated American patriot." He is seen mostly in his private jet or at the A-Team's safehouse in Langley, Virginia (set up by Stockwell). His existence is mostly secret, and his operation is shown to be purely dependent on him, set to "dissolve" if Stockwell doesn't call in to an undisclosed location at certain intervals.

Stockwell heads the EIA (Enhanced Intelligence Assets) which draws its personnel from the DIA, CIA and FBI. He is rumored to be a 3 star general who turned down retirement as a 4 star general for this hands-on assignment reporting  directly to the US President.

References

External links

The A-Team characters
American male characters in television
Fictional generals
Fictional United States Army personnel
Fictional special forces personnel
Television characters introduced in 1986